The Faroese Pilot Association is the national trade union of pilots in the Faroe Islands, covering all kinds of pilots (nationals as well as foreigners, fixed-wing and helicopter aircraft), especially those working for Atlantic Airways, the national airline.  In March 2019, the union signed a four year agreement with the employer's association; the agreement gives a 3.26% pay rise in 2019 and 2.56% in 2020, with subsequent years to be negotiated.

References

Aviation in the Faroe Islands
Airline pilots' trade unions
Trade unions in the Faroe Islands